Gregory Eugene Johnson (born 1961/1962) is an American businessman, and the executive chairman of Franklin Templeton Investments, a company founded in 1947 by his grandfather, Rupert H. Johnson Sr.

Early life
Johnson earned a bachelor's degree in accounting and business administration from Washington and Lee University.

Career
Johnson was CEO of Franklin from January 2004 to 2021. In 2011, he earned US$6.61 million, and $49.93 million over the past five years.

In June 2013, Johnson succeeded his father, Charles B. Johnson, as chairman of Franklin Templeton Investments.

Personal life
Johnson has a son and a daughter.

References

Living people
Washington and Lee University alumni
1960s births
American chief executives of financial services companies